Chukotsky (чуко́тский, [t]chukótskiy, masculine), Chukotskaya (чуко́тская, [t]chukótskaya, feminine), Chukotskoye (чуко́тское, [t]chukótskoye, neuter), or Chukotskiye (чуко́тские, [t]chukótskiye, plural) may refer to:
Chukotka Autonomous Okrug (Chukotsky avtonomny okrug), a federal subject of Russia
Chukotsky District (Chukotsky raión), a district of Chukotka Autonomous Okrug, Russia

See also 
Chukchi (disambiguation)
Chukotka (disambiguation)